Dorothy Day: Dissenting Voice of the American Century is a 2020 biography of Dorothy Day written by John Loughery and Blythe Randolph and published by Simon & Schuster.

Bibliography

External links 
 

2020 non-fiction books
American biographies
English-language books
Simon & Schuster books
Biographies about anarchists
Books about Christianity
Dorothy Day
Collaborative non-fiction books